Kristen van Elden (born 18 September 1981) is a former professional tennis player from Australia.

Biography
A former scholarship holder at the Victorian Institute of Sport, van Elden had a best ranking on the professional tour of 262 in the world.

She competed mainly on the ITF Circuit, with most of her titles coming in doubles.

Her only WTA Tour main-draw appearance came at the 2004 Ordina Open in the Netherlands, where she and Russia's Galina Fokina teamed up to make the quarterfinals of the doubles.

ITF Circuit finals

Singles: 5 (1–4)

Doubles: 13 (9–4)

References

External links
 
 

1981 births
Living people
Australian female tennis players
Tennis people from Victoria (Australia)
21st-century Australian women